The Peshawar Zalmi is a franchise cricket team that represents Peshawar in the Pakistan Super League. They are one of the five teams that had a competition in the 2016 Pakistan Super League. The team was captained by Shahid Afridi, and they stand on first position after winning six matches from their eight matches in the PSL 2016.

Background
Peshawar Zalmi is a franchise cricket team representing Peshawar, which plays in the Pakistan Super League (PSL).
In 2015, the Pakistan Cricket Board (PCB) announced that the inaugural season of the Pakistan Super League would take place in February 2016 in the United Arab Emirates. CEO of Haier Javed Afridi (cousin of Shahid Afridi) bought the team for US$16 million for a ten-year period.
It finished third in the inaugural season of PSL in the 2016.

Squad

Players with international caps before the start of the season are listed in bold.

Pakistan Super League

Before the start of the league zalmis were considered as a strongest team and  team to beat in first PSL.They proved every body right by winning their first two matches Thanks to brilliant performances from their openers Mohammad Hafeez and Tamim Iqbal 
Zalmi who played their first two matches on 5 and 6 February against Islamabad United and Lahore Qalandars respectively winning both of them beating United by 24 runs and Qalandars by 9 wickets. Their winning run ended after losing a close match against the underdogs of 2016 PSL Quetta Gladiators. after completing group stage matches they won six from eight matches losing against Lahore Qalandars in a close match and Quetta Gladiators they finished first in points table qualifying for the play-offs where they played against Quetta Gladiators in Qualifier 1. The first qualifier of the inaugural Pakistan Super League was a nail-biting affair and came down to the last ball, with Quetta Gladiators holding their nerve to clinch one run win. Gladiators posted 133 thanks to Kevin Pietersen (53) well supported by Kumar Sangakkara (37) after disastrous start, in reply Peshawar scoring 132 in their 20 Overs Darren Sammy's 38 from 29 could not save the team. Zalmi were left needing eight runs from six balls;Gladiators required three wickets. A dot off the first ball of the over, bowled by Aizaz Cheema, titled the contest further Quetta's way. However, Wahab Riaz seemed to emerge an unlikely hero for Zalmi, slamming the second ball – a low full toss outside off – over cow corner for four. He then proceeded to take a single. Three needed off three, and it was anybody's game. Cheema, though, drastically turned the fate of the match with his next two deliveries. First Hasan Ali was out caught and bowled. Then, Wahab swung wildly in an attempt to finish the game, but ended up skying the ball straight to Ahmed Shehzad at point. Cheema was on a hat-trick and Muhammad Asghar had the unenviable task of striking the last ball for at least three. Cheema did not get his hat-trick, but more importantly, Asghar was unable to put the bowler's rising short ball away as a result Aizaz Cheema become hero for Gladiators and qualified for the Final.Gladiator's Mohammad Nawaz for his 3 for 27 and 20 runs was judged man of the match against Zalmi.Islamabad United qualified for 2016 Pakistan Super League Final match by defeating Zalmi.United set 177 runs target for Zalmi after being sent in by Afridi to bat first. United's Batsman Sharjeel Khan 117 from 62 balls against strong bowling line-up of Zalmi proved to be the difference between them and United they only managed 126 runs after blistering inning from Shahid Afridi in the end of 38 from  17 balls and earlier Kamran Akmal scored 45 from 32 balls. As a result of this loss they were eliminated from the tournament. Wahab Riaz with 15 wickets was the leading wicket-taker for the team. Tamim Iqbal with 267 runs was team's leading run scorer.

Season standings

Match log

References

2016 in Khyber Pakhtunkhwa
2016 Pakistan Super League
Zalmi in 2016
2016